S-Cup Europe 2008 was a martial arts event co promoted by Shoot Boxing Europe and East Side Promotions.  It was a preliminary qualifying tournament for the Shoot Boxing World Tournament 2008, involving ten fighters (two being reservists) with all bouts fought under Shoot Boxing rules (70 kg/154 lbs).  All the tournament fighters were invitees selected on the basis of their achievements in kickboxing, Muay Thai and Savate (more information on the fighters is provided by the bulleted list below).  As well as tournament matches there were also a number of opening fights and super fights (including a retirement fight), and  a W.P.K.L. European title fight.  One of the opening fights was fought under Shoot Boxing rules while the rest of the matches were fought under Muay Thai rules.  In total there were thirty four fighters at the event, representing twelve countries, with weight classes ranging from under 32 kg to over 95 kg.  

The S-Cup Europe 2008 tournament was won by Denis Schneidmiller who defeated Dzhabar Askerov in the final by third round split decision.  As a result of his victory Schneidmiller would qualify for the Shoot Boxing World Tournament 2008.  Other notable results saw Ruben van der Giessen defeat Christian di Paolo to win the W.P.K.L. light heavyweight European title (79 kg/174 lbs), while Gerald Zwane was unable to get a victory in his final bout, losing to Jan van Denderen by decision after three rounds.  The event was held at the Oosterbliek Sporthal in Gorinchem, Netherlands on Saturday, 20 September 2008.

Tournament finalists
 Dzhabar Askerov - x2 Muay Thai world champion, The Contender Asia last 4
 Rudolf Durica - W.M.C. intercontinental champion '07, former world and European champion
 Goran Borović - W.I.P.U. "King of the Ring" Muay Thai world champion '06, x2 Savate world champion
 Joakim Karlsson - I.F.M.A. Muay Thai Amateur World Championships '06 silver medalist 
 Malik Mangouchi - x2 kickboxing and Muay Thai world champion
 Luis Reis - It's Showtime Trophy Portugal '07 champion, K-1 MAX Portugal champion '06
 Denis Schneidmiller - W.B.C. Muay Thai world champion '06, I.K.B.O. European champion '05
 Chris van Venrooij - W.F.C.A. world champion '03, W.M.C. intercontinental champion '02, x2 European champion

Tournament Reservists
 Harut Grigorian - up and coming Belgium based Armenian kickboxer
 Abdallah Mabel - W.F.C. world champion '07, W.P.K.C. intercontinental champion '05

S-Cup Europe 2008 Tournament

Results

See also
List of male kickboxers

References

Shoot boxing events
2008 in kickboxing
Kickboxing in the Netherlands
Sports competitions in South Holland
Sport in Gorinchem